The Gold Belt Tour Scenic and Historic Byway is a National Scenic Byway, a Back Country Byway, and a Colorado Scenic and Historic Byway located in Fremont and Teller counties, Colorado, USA. The byway is named for the Gold Belt mining region. The Cripple Creek Historic District is a National Historic Landmark. The byway forms a three-legged loop with the Phantom Canyon Road (narrow gravel), the Shelf Road (narrow unimproved), and the High Park Road (paved).

Route
The Gold Belt Byway contains many roads. Most of them are dirt roads that are narrow and run through canyons and other geological features.

Phantom Canyon Road
Phantom Canyon Road is a scenic road that connects Cañon City and Victor. The road goes through Phantom Canyon. The road has two tunnels and three elevated bridges. It has many camp locations. It was originally the route of a railroad that connected Florence and Cripple Creek. The route contains many narrow roads and high wooden bridges. The road is unpaved.

Shelf Road
Shelf Road is a portion of the byway going through Fourmile Canyon. It was originally used as a stagecoach road. The cliffs of the canyon near Shelf Road offer some of the best sport climbing in Colorado.

High Park Road
High Park Road was the first route to connect gold mines with the Arkansas Valley. Unlike Shelf Road and Phantom Canyon Road, it doesn't run through a canyon and is entirely paved. High Park Road is located in area where cattle ranching takes place.

Teller County Road 1
Teller County Road 1, shortened to Teller 1, was the first stagecoach route to Cripple Creek and thus it is called County Road 1. It is a paved road that offers diverse views of scenery. For example, along the road are steep mountains and rolling hills where cattle graze.

Gold Camp Road
Gold Camp Road follows the former railroad from Colorado Springs to Cripple Creek called the "Short Line". In the 1920s the railroad was converted to a car toll road, eventually becoming a free public road. In 1988, tunnel #3 collapsed and was never repaired. This portion of the road is now closed to vehicular traffic and is popular with bikers and hikers, and vehicular traffic was rerouted to Old Stage Road behind The Broadmoor. In September 2013, flooding washed out a large portion of the road between tunnels one and two. It is said that the tunnels are haunted and many stories abound concerning the tunnels.

Attractions
Colorado Territorial Prison Museum
Cripple Creek Historic District, a National Historic Landmark
Cripple Creek and Victor Narrow Gauge Railroad
Florissant Fossil Beds National Monument
Garden Park Fossil Area, a National Natural Landmark
Gold Camp Road
Phantom Canyon
Pikes Peak, a National Historic Landmark
Royal Gorge
Shelf Road

Gallery

See also

History Colorado
List of scenic byways in Colorado
Scenic byways in the United States

Notes

References

External links

America's Byways
America's Scenic Byways: Colorado
Bureau of Land Management Back Country Byways
Colorado Department of Transportation
Colorado Scenic & Historic Byways Commission
Colorado Scenic & Historic Byways
Colorado Travel Map
Colorado Tourism Office
History Colorado

Colorado Scenic and Historic Byways
National Scenic Byways
National Scenic Byways in Colorado
Bureau of Land Management Back Country Byways
Back Country Byways in Colorado
Florissant Fossil Beds National Monument
Transportation in Colorado
Transportation in Fremont County, Colorado
Transportation in Teller County, Colorado
Tourist attractions in Colorado
Tourist attractions in Fremont County, Colorado
Tourist attractions in Teller County, Colorado
U.S. Route 24
U.S. Route 50